Pseudaspidimerus is a genus of beetles belonging to the family Coccinellidae. The genus has primarily Oriental origin and consists with 11 described species.

Description
Body small, rounded to oval, or convex, and covered with dense pubescence. Clypeus narrowly expanded laterally over the eyes. Antennae very short, and with nine segments. The basal segment is the largest segment, where as second segment is subtriangular. The other segments form a gradually enlarged club, and the terminal segment is conical-shaped. Mentum obcordiform. Prosternal process is well developed, sub rectangular, and carinate. Abdomen consists with six visible sternites. Male has a robust penis.

Biology
Species are primarily aphidophagus, but also associated with mealybugs, scales and whiteflies. Grubs are almost similar to scales, and are often overlooked.

Species
 Pseudaspidimerus cornutus Huo, 2014 - Laos
 Pseudaspidimerus flaviceps (Walker 1859) - India, Sri Lanka
 Pseudaspidimerus infuscatus Kapur, 1967 - India
 Pseudaspidimerus lambai Kapur, 1967 - Andaman Islands
 Pseudaspidimerus limbatus Hoang (1982) - Vietnam, China
 Pseudaspidimerus mauliki Kapur, 1948 - India, Sri Lanka, Bangladesh, Thailand, Java
 Pseudaspidimerus palatus Huo & Wang, 2017 - Thailand, Malaysia, Singapore
 Pseudaspidimerus pulcher (Weise, 1908) - Indonesia
 Pseudaspidimerus trinotatus (Thunberg, 1781) - India, Sri Lanka, Myanmar
 Pseudaspidimerus toulakhomi Huo, 2014 - Laos
 Pseudaspidimerus uttami Kapur, 1948 - India and Sri Lanka

References

Coccinellidae